Hannibal Price (1875-1946) was a Haitian diplomat and politician.

From 1911 to 1913 he was Secretary at the Haitian Legation in Washington, D.C. He returned to Haiti, where he became counselor to the National Bureau du Contentieux. Some time later, Doctor Price was named Counselor of State, a position which, in conjunction with that of consulting counsel to the American financial counselor in Port-au-Prince.

From  to  he served as Minister Plenipotentiary to Washington, D.C. From  till  he was Haitian Minister of Agriculture.

References

1875 births
1946 deaths
Foreign Ministers of Haiti
Ambassadors of Haiti to the United States